Castilla ulei is a tree in the family Moraceae, native to South America, specifically in the Amazon rainforest.

References

Trees of Peru
Trees of Brazil
Trees of Ecuador
Trees of Colombia
Trees of Bolivia
Trees of French Guiana
Moraceae